The Christie NHS Foundation Trust in Withington, Manchester, manages the Christie Hospital, one of the largest cancer treatment centres of its type in Europe. The Christie became an NHS Foundation Trust in 2007 and is also an international leader in cancer research and development, home to the Paterson Institute for Cancer Research.

History

Foundation of the Christie Hospital
The Christie Hospital had its beginnings in the largesse of Sir Joseph Whitworth, a wealthy Mancunian inventor who left money in his will in 1887. He wanted this to be spent on good causes in Manchester and entrusted his bequest to three legatees, one of whom was Richard Copley Christie. Consequently, some of that money was used to buy land off Oxford Road, adjacent to Owens College and intended to allow the movement of the central Manchester hospitals out of the crowded city centre. A committee chaired by Christie was established in 1890 and, partly funded by a legacy of £10,000 from Daniel Proctor, a Cancer Pavilion and Home for Incurables was founded on the site in 1892 some distance south-east of the eye hospital. In 1901 it was renamed the Christie Hospital in honour of Richard Christie and his wife Mary. It was the only hospital outside London for the treatment of cancer alone and active in pathological research.

Foundation of the Holt Institute
In 1901, the Christie Management Committee agreed to the request of Dr Robert Biggs Wild to spend £50 on the equipment necessary to test the efficacy of X-ray treatment, after promising results reported from London and from three patients treated in the Physics Laboratory of Professor Schuster locally in Owens College. The Roentgen apparatus was purchased, but no records survive of treatment, and by 1907 the equipment was no longer being used (it was given to the Skin Hospital in 1910). By 1905, Dr Wild had become interested in the therapeutic use of the newly discovered radium and experimented, once more with aid from Professor Schuster, on three patients. Radium was expensive, however, and the management refused to purchase any more until the results of tests from London hospitals were available. By 1914, a leading local doctor, Sir William Milligan, had begun a campaign in the 'Manchester Guardian' to raise funds for radium treatment. Appealing to a mixture of local pride and the contemporary enthusiasm for the curative powers of radium, an appeal was launched, on the advice of Ernest Rutherford, for £25,000. An initial contribution of £2000 from local brewer Edward Holt was not initially much emulated, but following the intervention of the Mayor, a series of 'Radium days' were organized which eventually raised enough money to start a small Radium Institute, initially housed in the Manchester Royal Infirmary. In 1921 it moved to new premises in Nelson Street donated by Sir Edward and Lady Holt, and became the Manchester and District Radium Institute.
By contrast with the dispersed and competitive provision of London radiotherapy, Manchester became the first provider of a centralised radiotherapy service, which would have long-lasting effects on the patterns of British cancer care.

The Christie at Withington
In 1932 the institute, renamed as the Holt Radium Institute, and the Christie Hospital moved to a new joint site on Wilmslow Road, Withington and began to be jointly managed although a formal merger did not occur until 1946.

Ralston Paterson was appointed as Director of the Radium Institute in 1931, and went on, with a small hand picked team, to build a world recognised centre for the treatment of cancer by radiation. Among the team was his wife Edith Paterson, who started research work at the Christie in 1938, initially unpaid, and who became an expert in radiation biology. 
The first betatron machine was purchased from Paris and installed in the building, run by Marjorie Pearce.

The department, was the subject of a live  BBC TV programme, "Your Life In Their Hands" in the late 1950s. A telerecording of this programme exists online.

After Ralston Paterson's retirement in 1963, Professor Eric Craig Easson, CBE, was appointed Director of the Christie Hospital. He became world famous for his contribution to the curability of Hodgkin's disease and to cancer education. He was awarded a personal Professorial Chair at the University of Manchester, and was President of the Royal College of Radiologists (1975–1977). He was the government adviser on cancer for many years, and was a prime mover in the Union Internationale Contre Cancer in Geneva, as well as the WHO cancer group.
During Professor Easson's tenure as Director, many doctors from throughout the world visited the Christie Hospital to absorb its ethos and to learn its techniques.

Early impetuses to research came from new local diseases of industrialisation such as mule spinners' cancer and chimney sweep's cancer, and the search for links to machine oils and airborne soot. Subsequent therapeutic milestones have included: 
 1932 - development of the Manchester Method, the first international standard for radium treatment
 1944 - world's first clinical trial of diethylstilbestrol (Stilboestrol) for breast cancer
 1970 - world's first clinical use of tamoxifen (Nolvadex) for breast cancer
 1986 - world's first use of cultured bone marrow for leukaemia treatment
 1991 - world's first single harvest blood stem-cell transplant

Cancer Research UK Manchester Institute (former Paterson Institute for Cancer Research)
Professor Laszlo Lajtha was appointed director of research in 1962. New research laboratories, provided by the Women's Trust Fund and named after the Patersons, were opened in 1966. The Women's Trust Fund was a local charity, chaired by Lady Margaret Holt, daughter-in-law of Sir Edward Holt, who left her entire estate of over £8 million to the Christie when she died in 1997. Core funding for the laboratories was secured from the Medical Research Council and the Cancer Research Campaign (CRC). The CRC also located the CRC Department of Medical Oncology, led by Professor Derek Crowther, at the Paterson.

Lajtha was succeeded as Director in 1983 by Professor David Harnden. Professor T. Michael Dexter served in the post for a short time before the appointment of Professor Nic Jones as Director in March 1999. Professor Jones stepped down in 2011 and Professor Richard Marais was appointed as the new Director in 2012.

The Paterson Institute for Cancer Research changed its name to the Cancer Research UK Manchester Institute (CRUK MI) on 1 October 2013.

Mid-morning on 26 April 2017, emergency services were called to the CRUK MI building to tackle a large fire which broke out on the institute's roof. The blaze rapidly spread throughout the building, destroying cancer research facilities and leading to the displacement of over 300 scientists and support staff. A forensic investigation conducted by the Greater Manchester Fire and Rescue Service determined that the most probable cause of the fire was from hot debris from welding work being carried out on the institute roof which landed on cardboard, carpet and other flammable substances.

In April 2018, plans were revealed to build a new state-of-the-art cancer research centre on the site of the former Paterson building, due to open in early 2021.

Services
The Christie registers around 12,500 new patients and treats about 40,000 patients every year. It is the lead cancer centre for the Greater Manchester and Cheshire Cancer Network, covering a population of 3.2 million, and runs clinics at 16 other general hospitals.

The Christie annually delivers over 30,000 chemotherapy treatments and undertakes around 3,700 operations every year. It has one of the eight dedicated teenage cancer units in the United Kingdom. It has 257 inpatient beds with an average length of stay of seven days.

The hospital has one of the largest clinical trials units in the United Kingdom for phase I/II cancer trials, with around 1,200 patients going on new trials, with plans to double over the next few years to be one of largest clinical trials units in the world.
 
It is a partner in the Manchester Cancer Research Centre and home to the North West Cancer Information Service, the cancer registry for the whole of the North West region, and the Wolfson Molecular Imaging Centre.

In 2020 the trust started using Isansys Lifecare's Patient Status Engine for Covid-19 patients both in hospital and at home. It collects continuous physiological data, including heart rate, respiration rate, heart rate variability, ECG, oxygen saturation, blood pressure, and body temperature. This generates an early warning score which enables earlier identification of those patients most in need of intervention.

It started a new electronic Patient Reported Outcome Measures service in 2022.  There are over 680 forms to be digitalised.

Private treatment
HCA Healthcare has run a specialist private cancer unit in partnership with the trust since 2010.   20% of the oncologists who work at the Trust have shares in this venture.   It generated revenues of £25 million in 2018–9.

Foundation Trust

The Christie became a NHS Foundation Trust on 1 April 2007. It has a total annual turnover of around £143 million. Eight percent of its income is from private patients. Around 2,000 staff and over 300 volunteers work at the Christie.

The first Chair of the Trust was Jim Martin. He was replaced in May 2011 by Lord Keith Bradley.

Caroline Shaw, the chief executive of the trust, was suspended from her duties on 19 December 2013 while investigations were conducted as part of a disciplinary process. It was alleged that she had made an improper claim for the payment of expenses for a retreat in Ibiza organised by the Young Presidents' Organization, of which she had become a member with the Trust's agreement.  In February 2014 Lord Bradley announced that he would resign from the board as a consequences of disagreements about the way in which the suspension of the Chief Executive was being handled. Sir Hugh Taylor was appointed as interim Chair of the Trust.  Shaw resigned in October 2014, having been suspended on full pay for 11 months- amounting to £170,000 and left with another six months salary - just under £100,000.

Dr Kim Holt, chair of the patient safety campaign group Patients First, demanded an independent investigation into claims of bullying, intimidation and dismissal of whistleblowers at the Trust in March 2014.  A report was conducted by Monitor (NHS) and the CQC which concluded there was no evidence of serious failings of governance or widespread cultural issues at the trust. NHS England commissioned a review in 2020 into events at the trust after whistleblowers raised numerous concerns over a research project with pharmaceutical giant Roche.  The review, led by Angela Schofield, chair of Harrogate and District NHS Foundation Trust described the trust’s research division as “ineffective” and said it had “allowed inappropriate behaviours to continue without challenge”.  She went on to say “The leadership of The Christie had a number of opportunities to avert this rapid review as colleagues in the R&I division began to speak up about their concerns. Not only did they not seem to recognise this but there were occasions when they appeared to be defensive and dismissive.”  The board responded by saying "we do not have systematic problems with discrimination, bullying or responding to concerns."

Performance
It was named by the Health Service Journal as one of the top hundred NHS trusts to work for in 2015. At that time it had 2,313 full-time equivalent staff and a sickness absence rate of 3.41%. 92% of staff recommend it as a place for treatment and 73% recommended it as a place to work.  The Care Quality Commission rated it as outstanding in 2016.

In 2018 the trust entered into a partnership arrangement with Hoffmann-La Roche which was intended to involve The Christie providing blood samples from 5,000 patients per year, with the company’s subsidiaries, Flatiron Health and Foundation Medicine, building a "clinico-genomic database". Reports into the project found that there was "insufficient due diligence on alternative options" and no formal procurement process.  Staff concerns raised at the time were brushed aside as was legal advice that it was "not as clear as we might hope that any research…[carried] out will be for the benefit of the trust at all".

See also
 Healthcare in Greater Manchester
 List of hospitals in England
 List of NHS trusts
 Cancer in the United Kingdom

References

External links
The Christie NHS Foundation Trust homepage
About the Hospital
History of the Hospital
The Paterson Institute for Cancer Research
The Wolfson Molecular Imaging Centre

Withington
NHS foundation trusts
Health in Greater Manchester
Cancer organisations based in the United Kingdom